Westfield, Alabama is a former coal mining camp for Tennessee Coal & Iron Co. that was purchased by U.S. Steel and developed as a planned steel worker community that was predominantly African American. It was home to Westfield High School. In 1969 it was described as a model of company owned community with various amenities noted.

Early in businessman A. G. Gaston's career he worked in the mines around Westfield. After his return from military service in Europe during World War I, he "was as a labourer with the Tennessee Coal & Iron Co. in Westfield, Alabama where his interest in entrepreneurship began to surface." Star professional baseball player Willie Mays was born in Westfield in 1931. Lawyer and former judge U. W. Clemon grew up in Westfield.

Rev. Clarence S. Reeves wrote a history of the high school. It closed with desegregation. Alumni remained active in subsequent years. In 2013 the film Westfield: Struggles to Success about Westfield High School debuted.

Notable people
 U. W. Clemon, (b 1943) is an Alabama attorney and a former United States District Judge of the United States District Court for the Northern District of Alabama.
 A. G. Gaston, (1892–1996) was an American businessman who established a number of businesses in Birmingham, Alabama.
 Willie Mays, (b 1931),  is a former Major League Baseball player and member of the baseball Hall Of Fame for the New York / San Francisco Giants.

See also
Fairfield, Alabama, a nearby U.S. Steel company town

References

Former populated places in Alabama